Rich Kids Go Skint is a British television series which featured "rich kids" who are paired up with families not as wealthy as them, and are usually required to do basic tasks such as: food shopping for the family, cooking dinner for them and washing up, giving them an understanding of how living with a small amount of money can be incredibly hard for the families.

Series overview

Episodes

Series 1 (2018)

Series 2 (2018)

Series 3 (2019)

Series 4 (2019)

Rich Kids Go Homeless
Whilst under the "Rich Kids" franchise name, Rich Kids Go Homeless was created by Zeppelin Films, a different company for the franchise who used Twenty Twenty for Rich Kids Go Shopping and Kalel Productions for Rich Kids Go Skint.

References

2018 British television series debuts
2021 British television series endings
2010s British reality television series
2020s British reality television series
Channel 5 (British TV channel) original programming
English-language television shows